Enriqueta "Etang" Discher Grau (November 24, 1906 – November 22, 1991) was a prominent Filipina character film actress frequently cast in villainous roles. Her stern, gaunt Castilian face loomed in many post-war Filipino films, especially soap opera-type dramas. She was the woman Filipino movie audiences loved to hate, often playing a villainous aunt, mother-in-law or even a witch. While her roles were hardly predisposed to have made her a star, she nonetheless was one of the more famous (or infamous) and durable stars of Filipino films. Many of her films were produced by Sampaguita Pictures, the studio under which she was under contract for a significant part of her career.

Discher was born to a German father, Leo Discher Sr. and a Filipina mother, Pacencia Discher. She has a sister named Elena Discher. Her extended family resides on the West Coast of the United States in Washington state and California. She began her career in the show business as a chorus girl in the bodabil stage shows of Katy de la Cruz. Her son, Panchito, became a famous film comedian in his own right, usually cast as the comedic foil to Dolphy.

Filmography

References

Notes

External links

1906 births
1981 deaths
Filipino film actresses
Filipino people of German descent
Filipino television actresses
Filipino television personalities
People from Manila
People of American colonial Philippines
Tagalog people
20th-century Filipino actresses